Luis Angel Acosta (born 14 September 1948) is a Mexican former swimmer. He competed in two events at the 1968 Summer Olympics.

References

External links
 

1948 births
Living people
Mexican male swimmers
Olympic swimmers of Mexico
Swimmers at the 1968 Summer Olympics
Swimmers from Mexico City
Swimmers at the 1967 Pan American Games
Pan American Games competitors for Mexico